Kok Thawa (Kok Thaw, Gugu Dhaw), also known as Koko Petitj, Uw Inhal, or Ogh Injigharr, is a Paman language of the Cape York Peninsula, Queensland in Australia.

References 

Southwestern Paman languages
Indigenous Australian languages in Queensland